Phillip Parsons is an American former professional stock car racing driver, team owner, and current analyst for FOX NASCAR.  After years racing in NASCAR Winston Cup, he returned to the Busch Series where he enjoyed modest success.

After his racing career, Parsons also embarked on a career as a racing TV commentator, providing color analysis for the Mizlou Television Network. He was also a commentator for the DirecTV NASCAR Hot Pass during Sprint Cup races. Most recently he has been a color analyst for FS1's coverage of the NASCAR Camping World Truck Series and the currently ARCA Menards Series.

He was the starter, waving the green flag for the 2007 Daytona 500. In 2008 he became a part-owner of a new Nationwide Series team, MSRP Motorsports.

Beginnings 
Phil Parsons began racing in the Late Model Series and the NASCAR Goody's Dash Series. When the Late Model Series became the Busch Series in 1982, Parsons joined the circuit full-time, driving the No. 28 Skoal Pontiac for Johnny Hayes. He won his first career race, at Bristol Motor Speedway, and led the championship points early in the season. He won the pole in two of the last three races of the season and finished fifth in points. The following season, he competed in a limited schedule, 22 out of 35 races, but won four poles and had twelve top-tens, finishing fifth in the points. That season, he also ran five Winston Cup races with Hayes in the No. 66, posting two top-ten finishes.

Winston Cup 

In 1984, Hayes and Parsons joined the Cup Series and ran twenty-two races, posting three top-eight finishes and ended the season placing 24th in the standings, second behind Rusty Wallace for NASCAR Rookie of the Year. The same year, his Busch ride was bought by Jack Ingram and Parsons ran five races for him, and had two top-five finishes. In 1985, he ran the full season, splitting time between Jackson Bros. Motorsports and Roger Hamby's car. Despite four top-tens, he failed to finish in thirteen races, and wound up 21st in points.

In 1986, Parsons ran seventeen races, and had a best finish of fifth at Talladega. He had four more top-tens, but finished twenty-seventh in the final standings. The following season, he got his first full-time Cup ride, with the Jackson brothers, when he signed on to drive their No. 55 Oldsmobile, garnering seven top-10s and a fourteenth-place finish in the final points standings. In 1988, Parsons led 52 laps at the Winston 500 and achieved his only Cup win. He also had a career-best points finish of ninth that season. The next season, however, he only had two top-five finishes and lost his ride at the end of the season.

He began 1990 driving the No. 4 car for Morgan-McClure Motorsports, but was released only three races into the season. He ran at Bristol for Jackson in a one-race deal, finishing the race in 25th, and also drove for Phil Barkdoll and Lake Speed. He made his most starts with the fledgling Diamond Ridge Motorsports, his best finish with them was a 21st at Darlington. He did not run the Cup series in 1991, but rather a handful of Busch races in his own equipment leased from Diamond Ridge. He had two top-10s, including a fourth-place finish at Darlington. After beginning 1992 with a tenth-place at the Daytona 500 with Melling Racing, he returned to Busch to run seven races, and had five top-10s.

In 1993, Parsons returned to the Cup series, running the No. 41 Chevy for Larry Hedrick Motorsports. Despite an eighth-place finish at North Carolina Speedway, Parsons was released near the end of the season. Phil ended the 1993 season with a ninth-place finish at Atlanta Motor Speedway while driving for Butch Mock Motorsports.

Return to Busch Series 
In 1994, Parsons returned to the Busch Series on a limited schedule in a car owned by his wife Marcia. He won his second and final Busch race at the Champion 300, and finished 25th in points after running just seventeen races. He went back to full-time racing in 1995 in the No. 99 Luxaire Chevrolet for J&J Racing, posting nine top-tens and finishing eighth in points. The following season, he and Marcia returned to car owner duties with the No. 10 Channellock Chevrolet. He began the season with consecutive third-place finishes but moved down to ninth in points. The next season, he finished in the top-ten in each of the first six races of the season posted a best finish of sixth in points. He also made his final Cup start that season for SABCO Racing at Darlington, when he replaced Joe Nemechek, who was on bereavement leave (Nemechek's brother John was killed at Homestead the previous week). He finished 31st.

With sponsorship from Dura Lube in 1998, Parsons matched his 1997 points finish. Alltel joined as primary sponsors for 1999, but Parsons failed to qualify for the NAPA 200 and dropped to fifteenth in the standings. At the end of the season, he merged his team with ST Motorsports to drive the No. 59 Chevrolet, and finished twelfth in points despite just two top-tens. His last start in NASCAR competition came at Kentucky Speedway in 2001. Driving the No. 97 Curb Agajanian Performance Group car, Parsons started fifth but finished 34th after a wreck late in the race.

Motorsports career results

NASCAR
(key) (Bold – Pole position awarded by qualifying time. Italics – Pole position earned by points standings or practice time. * – Most laps led.)

Winston Cup Series

Daytona 500

Busch Series

ARCA Permatex SuperCar Series
(key) (Bold – Pole position awarded by qualifying time. Italics – Pole position earned by points standings or practice time. * – Most laps led.)

24 Hours of Daytona
(key)

References

External links
 
 
Parsons on SPEEDtv.com

Living people
1957 births
Sportspeople from Detroit
Racing drivers from Detroit
NASCAR drivers
ISCARS Dash Touring Series drivers
NASCAR team owners
Motorsport announcers
American television sports announcers
ARCA Menards Series drivers
Dale Earnhardt Inc. drivers